Hector Champagne (February 18, 1862 – June 29, 1941) was a Canadian lawyer and politician.

Born in Saint-Eustache, Canada East, Champagne was educated at the Académie commerciale de Saint-Eustache, the Séminaire de Sainte-Thérèse-de-Blainville, the Collège Bourget, the Université Laval à Montréal, and the University of Paris. He was called to the Bar of Quebec in 1886 and created a Queen's Counsel in 1899.

A lawyer, he was elected to the Legislative Assembly of Quebec in Deux-Montagnes in 1897. A Liberal, he was re-elected in 1900 and acclaimed in 1904. He was defeated in 1908. He was appointed to the Legislative Council of Quebec for Mille-Isles in 1908. He died in office in Saint-Laurent, Quebec in 1941.

References

1862 births
1941 deaths
Canadian King's Counsel
Lawyers in Quebec
Quebec Liberal Party MNAs
Quebec Liberal Party MLCs
People from Saint-Eustache, Quebec